John Henry "Dick" Turpin (August 20, 1876 – March 10, 1962) was a sailor in the United States Navy in the late 19th and early 20th centuries. Turpin was one of the first African American Chief Petty Officers in the U.S. Navy.

Early life and career
Turpin was born on August 20, 1876, in Long Branch, New Jersey and enlisted in the U.S. Navy in New York City on November 4, 1896.

USS Maine
He was a Mess Attendant on the battleship  when it exploded in Havana Harbor, Cuba under mysterious circumstances on the night of 15 February 1898.  Turpin was in the pantry of the wardroom when the explosion occurred, and felt the ship "heave and lift" before all went dark. He worked his way aft and climbed out of the wardroom on the captain's ladder and up onto the deck. He dove overboard and was rescued by a motor launch. Turpin was one of 90 out of the 350 officers and men aboard Maine that night to survive the explosion.

According to an obituary that appeared in the Los Angeles Times, Turpin saw action in China during the 1900 Boxer Rebellion.  The 1900 U.S. Census shows him as assigned to the survey ship USS Ranger based at San Diego, California.  Ranger, however, did not participate in the Boxer Rebellion.

Bennington explosion

By mid-1905, Turpin had been assigned to the gunboat . When that ship was raising steam for a departure from San Diego, California, on 21 July 1905, she suffered a boiler explosion that sent men and machinery into the air and killed 66 of the 102 men aboard. Turpin reportedly saved three officers and twelve men by swimming them to shore one at a time. Eleven men were awarded the Medal of Honor for "extraordinary heroism displayed at the time of the explosion", but Turpin was not among them.

Later career
Before and following the Bennington explosion, Turpin was assigned to Mare Island Naval Shipyard in California.  It was during this time he probably learned to be a diver.

In 1915 Turpin worked as a diver in efforts to raise the sunken submarine USS F-4 in Honolulu, Hawaii.  He became qualified as a "Master Diver" - most probably the first African-American sailor to do so.  (It is often erroneously reported that Master Chief Petty Officer Carl Brashear held this honor.)  Turpin was also credited with being involved with the development of the underwater cutting torch.

Turpin served on several other ships before leaving active duty service in 1916.

After the United States entered World War I in April 1917, Turpin was recalled to service. On 1 June 1917, he became a Chief Gunner's Mate on the cruiser , which made him among the first African American Chief Petty Officers in the U.S. Navy. Turpin served at that rank until he was transferred to the Fleet Reserve in March 1919. In October 1925, Turpin retired at the rank of Chief Gunner's Mate.

During his time in the Navy, he was the Navy boxing champion in several different weight classifications throughout his Navy career and was a boxing instructor at the United States Naval Academy in Annapolis, Maryland.

Other assignments
In addition to the above-mentioned ships, Turpin was assigned to the following ships during his career: USS Badger, USS Cheyenne (BM-10), USS Pittsburgh (ACR-4), USS Severn, USS Hartford, USS Independence, USS South Dakota, USS Alert, USS Ranger, USS Montgomery (C-9), USS Vermont (BB-20).

Later life
After his retirement from the Navy, Turpin was employed as a Master Rigger at the Puget Sound Navy Yard in Bremerton, Washington; he was also qualified as a Master Diver in his civilian duties.

During World War II, Turpin tried to return to active service but was denied on account of his age.  He volunteered to tour Navy training facilities and defense plants to make "inspirational visits" to African-American sailors.

Death

Turpin died in Bremerton, Washington on 10 March 1962. He was survived by his wife Faye Alice.  At his funeral, his pall bearers were six Navy chief stewards.  His body was cremated and his ashes were buried at sea.  There is a cenotaph on his honor at the Ivy Green Cemetery in Bremerton. In recognition of Turpin's accomplishments, the Post Office at 602 Pacific Avenue in Bremerton, Washington has been renamed the John Henry Turpin Post Office Building. The bill renaming the Post Office was passed unanimously by both chambers of the U.S. Congress and signed into law on Dec. 21.

Awards
Good Conduct Medal
Navy Expeditionary Medal
Spanish Campaign Medal
China Relief Expedition Medal
Nicaraguan Campaign Medal
Mexican Service Medal
World War I Victory Medal with two service stars

See also
Carl Brashear
Donna Tobias, first female diver in the U.S. Navy

References

1876 births
1962 deaths
United States Navy sailors
People from Long Branch, New Jersey